In computing, eSATAp (also known as Power over eSATA, Power eSATA, eSATA/USB Combo, eSATA USB Hybrid Port/EUHP) is a combination  connection for external storage devices. An eSATA or USB device can be plugged into an eSATAp port. The socket has keyed cutouts for both types of device to ensure that a connector can only be plugged in the right way.

Standard
As the port is designed to work with both SATA and USB, both organizations have formally approved it. The USB Implementers Forum states it does not support any connector used by other standards, hence such 'combo' ports are to be used at one's own risk. As of 2011 the organization responsible for the SATA specification, SATA-IO (Serial ATA International Organization), is working to define the eSATAp specification.

Implementation
SATA is a computer bus interface for connecting host bus adapters to mass storage devices such as hard disk drives and optical drives. eSATA is a SATA connector accessible from outside the computer, to provide a signal (but not power) connection for external storage devices.

eSATAp combines the functionality of an eSATA and a USB port, and a source of power in a single connector. eSATAp can supply power at 5 V and 12 V.

On a desktop computer the port is simply a connector, usually mounted on a bracket at the back accessible from outside the machine, connected to motherboard sources of SATA, USB, and power at 5 V and 12 V. No change is required to drivers, registry or BIOS settings and the USB support is independent of the SATA connection.

If advanced functionality such as a port multiplier is required, a PCI Express add-on card can be used. If it has port multiplier support, an eSATAp port allows a user to connect to a multi-bay NAS (network attached storage) machine with multiple hard disks (HDD) using one eSATA cable.

On many notebook computers only a limited amount of power at 5 V is available, and none at all at 12 V. Devices requiring more power than is available via the Expresscard, or an additional 12 V supply as required by most 3.5" or 5.25" drives, can be driven if an additional power supply is used. Cables are available to both connect and power a SATA device from an eSATAp port (including 12 V power if available).

Compatibility

eSATAp throughput is not necessarily the same as SATA, many enclosures and docks that support both eSATA and USB use combo bridge chips which can severely reduce the throughput, and USB throughput is that of the USB version supported by the port (typically USB 3.0 or 2.0). eSATAp ports (bracket versions) can run at a theoretical maximum of 6 gigabits per second (Gbit/s) and are backwards compatible with devices such as eSATA 3 Gbit/s (SATA Revision 2) and also at 1.5 Gbit/s (SATA Revision 1). The USB port is fully compatible with USB 5 Gbit/s (USB 3.0), USB 480 Mbit/s (USB 2.0) and USB 12 Mbit/s (1.1); USB 3.0 devices are compatible, but will operate at USB 2.0 speed if internal USB 3.0 connector is not connected.

+12 V issue

There are only two versions of this port. Most laptop computers do not have 12 V power available, and have an eSATAp port which provides only 5 V. Desktop computers, with 12 V available, have a port with two additional pads, placed against the plug's "horns", which provide 12 V. Some manufacturers refer to these ports as eSATApd, where d stands for "dual voltage". Some devices, such as 2.5-inch drives, can operate off the 5 V supplied by laptop eSATAp ports. Others, such as 3.5-inch drives, also require 12 V; they can be powered from a desktop eSATAp port, but require an external 12 V power supply if used with a laptop computer. This can lead to confusion if users are not aware of the distinction.

eSATAp PCI and PCI-e add-on cards are available for desktop computers. They usually provide two eSATAp ports, with port multiplier functionality, and hot-swap capability.

eSATAp cables are available with wide connectors to plug directly into the power and signal connectors of a bare drive, providing a 12 V supply in the case of a desktop machine. A version of this wide connector is found inside every external SATA hard drive enclosure; when the hard drive is slid inside, it mates with a connector that supplies it with both signal and power.

If the smaller side of this cable is plugged into a "powered" ESATA port, providing both 12 V and 5 V, then the wide end may be plugged into a 2.5" or 3.5" SATA hard drive, supplying the bare drive with both signal and power. The small 2.5" drive will get signal and power at 5 V, which is all that the smaller drive requires, and which the larger 3.5" drive requires only for its logic board. Additionally, the larger 3.5" drive will get the 12 V it needs to power its disk spindle motor. Thus a bare hard drive may be attached directly to the computer, powered by the unique cable, where it will run at full SATA speeds, without the necessity of placing the hard drive into an external enclosure.

Naming
The following names are used by different manufacturers for the same port:
 eSATAp (Delock, Dynex, Lindy, Addonics)
 eSATApd (Used by Delock to distinguish a port that supplies both +5 V and +12 V)
 Power over eSATA (Delock, Micro-Star International (MSI))
 eSATA/USB (Gigabyte Technology)
 Power eSATA/USB (ASRock)

Other computer manufacturers are shipping computers and motherboards with eSATAp ports including Dell, HP, Lenovo, Sony and Toshiba.

Patents 
US Patent US7572146B1 appears to document the eSATApd variant.

References

Bibliography

eSATA | SATA-IO
Upgrading and Repairing PCs: Upgrading and Repairing_c22
Moving Media Storage Technologies: Applications & Workflows for Video and Media Server Platforms

External links
eSATAp

Serial buses
USB